Elegy is an album recorded by the cellist Julian Lloyd Webber in 1998 for Philips.

Track listing
 Elegie (Gabriel Fauré)
 Adagio (Tomaso Albinoni)
 Le cygne (Camille Saint-Saëns)
 Nocturne (Evert Taube)
 Jesus bleibet meine Freude (Johann Sebastian Bach)
 "Song of the Indian Merchant" (Nikolai Rimsky-Korsakov)
 Clair de lune (Claude Debussy)
 "Ave Maria" (Bach, Charles Gounod)
 Cello Concerto (Adagio-moderato) (Edward Elgar)
 "Beau Soir" (Debussy)
 "Songs My Mother Taught Me" (Antonín Dvořák)
 "To the Spring" (Edvard Grieg)
 Cantata BWV 156 (Adagio) (Bach)
 Träumerei (Robert Schumann)
 "Brezairola" (Joseph Canteloube)
 "Song of the Black Swan" (Heitor Villa-Lobos)
 Shepherd's Lullaby (Thomas J.  Hewitt)
 Itsuki Lullaby (San-Lang)
 Requiem (Pie Jesu) (Andrew Lloyd Webber)

Personnel
Julian Lloyd Webber
Pamela Chowhan
John Lenehan
Sven-Bertil Taube
English Chamber Orchestra
Royal Philharmonic Orchestra
Yehudi Menuhin
Nicholas Cleobury
Barry Wordsworth
Yan Pascal Tortelier

References

External links 

 Elegy reviews
 Filmed performances at YouTube:
 Élégie
 Le cygne
 "Ave Maria"
 Cello Concerto

1980s classical albums
Julian Lloyd Webber albums